Cassandra M. Zampini (born 1983) is a New York City based American photographer and digital artist.

Early life and education 
While at high school Zampini took portrait photographs of graduating seniors.

Mostly self-taught in photography, Zampini did study at Boson University when she took on a summer internship with New World Outlook she was sent to South America to write about and photograph on poverty and globalization. Zampini realized the impact that photography could have and that internship has shaped her work.

Career 
After the internship Zampini became the principal photographer for the parent company of New World Outlook where she managed campaign shoots. Her next job was as a photojournalist for a local newspaper in Connecticut, while also undertaking freelance work for companies at events, doing corporate events, and photo shoots.

Zampini's 2016 photographic essay The Commute appeared in the Atlantic magazine.

In 2018, the Facebook–Cambridge Analytica data scandal prompted Zampini to pivot her focus towards digital media. Also in 2018, her first show in New York City focused on her ongoing project, Data Mine. In 2020, she received critical attention for her 25-minute film Media Warfare, which condensed clips of fake news and conspiracy theories.

Her work is included in the collection of the Museum of Fine Arts, Houston, the University of Arizona's Center for Creative Photography, the Arnot Art Museum, the Griffin Museum of Photography in Winchester. She has exhibibited her work at ArtYard in Frenchtown, as well as at various art galleries in Boston. Zampini was part of A Yellow Rose Project; a 2020 artistic reflection on the 100 year anniversary of the Nineteenth Amendment to the United States Constitution.

In 2022, Zampini was selected as a National Arts Club fellow, which provides an eighteen month residency.

Personal life 
Zampini is based in New York City. She has a brother who is an anthropologist, and is married.

References

External links

Media Warfare, 2020 film, by Cassandra Zampini, Vimeo

Living people
1983 births
21st-century American photographers
Boston University alumni
21st-century American women photographers
American digital artists
Photographers from New York City
Artists from New York City